Offpiste Aviation Limited (Off The Beaten Track) was a British aircraft manufacturer based in Dursley, Gloucestershire and founded by hang glider competition pilot Colin Lark. The company specialized in the design and manufacture of hang gliders in the form of ready-to-fly aircraft.

The company was founded in 1995 and went out of business when Lark died of cancer on 8 September 2003.

The company was founded to produce the Discovery series of hang gliders, designed by Bill Pain. The  Discovery series are termed Sky Floaters, hang gliders designed for slow, local flying, lightness of weight and ease of handling, over high performance and cross-country capability. The series quickly became the best selling hang glider design in the UK by the mid-2000s.

Aircraft

References

External links
Company website archives on Archive.org

Defunct aircraft manufacturers of England
Hang gliders
1995 establishments in England
2003 disestablishments in England
Companies based in Gloucestershire